Henry was a merchant ship built in Buckler's Hard, England, in 1826. She made one voyage transporting convicts from Mauritius to Australia. She grounded off Fremantle in 1841 and was refloated, only to disappear after leaving Moulmein.

Career
Henry' first appeared in Lloyd's Register ('LR) in 1826 with H.Bunney, master, Row, owner, and trade London–New south Wales.

Under the command of Captain Bunney, she left Cape of Good Hope on 4 February 1838 with passengers and cargo and arrived at Sydney on 5 May. She left Port Jackson on 15 July bound for Mauritius. After having difficulty getting a cargo, Henry returned to Sydney with two convicts, passengers and cargo, arriving on 26 February 1839.  Henry left Port Jackson on 10 May 1839 bound for London with passengers and cargo.

Changing owners, she sailed under the command of Captain Todd, arriving at Perth on 20 April 1841.

Fate
She went aground off Fremantle in 1841 and was refloated shortly after. Henry was last seen after leaving Moulmein in late 1841.

Citations and references
Citations

References

1826 ships
Ships built on the Beaulieu River
Convict ships to New South Wales
Age of Sail merchant ships
Merchant ships of the United Kingdom
Maritime incidents in 1841